A histamine agonist is a drug which causes increased activity at one or more of the four histamine receptor subtypes.

H2: Betazole and Impromidine are examples of agonists used in diagnostics to increase histamine.

H3: Betahistine is a weak Histamine1 agonist and a very strong Histamine3 antagonist (paradoxically histamine increasing).

See also
 Histamine antagonist

External links